LCHS  may refer to:

 Lady Commander of the Order of the Holy Sepulchre, a Catholic chivalric order 
 Little Compton Historical Society, a non-profit organization in Little Compton, Rhode Island, United States

Secondary schools
 Canada
 Laval Catholic High School (renamed Laurier Senior High School) - Laval, Quebec (Montreal area)
 Luther College High School – Regina, Saskatchewan

 United Kingdom
 England
 Lincoln Christ's Hospital School - Lincoln, Lincolnshire
 Lincolnshire Community Health Services
 London Central High School, a component of London Central Elementary High School, a United States Department of Defense Dependents School (DoDDS) school

 United States
 Alabama
 Lauderdale County High School - Rogersville
 California
 La Cañada High School
 Laguna Creek High School
 Florida
 Liberty County High School
 Georgia
 Lanier County High School
 Idaho
 Lake City High School
 Illinois
 Lakes Community High School
 Lincoln Community High School
 Indiana
 Lake Central High School
 Lawrence Central High School
 Kentucky
 Lee County High School
 Lexington Catholic High School
 Massachusetts
 Lynn Classical High School
 Michigan
 Lansing Catholic High School
 Mississippi
 Leflore County High School
 New Mexico
 Las Cruces High School
 Pennsylvania
 Lancaster Catholic High School
 Lansdale Catholic High School
 Texas
 Lakeview Centennial High School
 Lamar Consolidated High School
 Virginia
 Louisa County High School
 Washington State
 Lynden Christian High School